The 2009 World Indoor Bowls Championships  was held at Potters Leisure Resort, Hopton on Sea, Great Yarmouth, England, from 05-26 January 2009. The event was sponsored by Potters Holidays.

Billy Jackson won the Men's singles defeating Robert Weale in the final.

Winners

Draw and results

Men's singles

Finals

Top half

Bottom half

Men's Pairs

Women's singles

Mixed Pairs

References

External links
Official website

2009 in bowls
World Indoor Bowls Championship